Gosainpur Sargaram is a detective story written by Satyajit Ray starring his famous characters Feluda and Topshe. It was first published in Sandesh in 1976.

Plot
Feluda is called to Gosaipur by Jiban Mallick, the son of the local Zamindar Shyamlal Mallick to investigate a threat of his father's life. Everyone in the village knows that father and the son are at loggerheads. Shyamlal is also an eccentric who eschews anything modern. Then, instead of Syamlal, his son Jiban Mallick is killed and the wealth of Mallick's looted. Oddly though, the dead body of Jiban Mallick vanishes, only to reappear again. Feluda works this out with a mixture of investigating skills and deception. The oxymoric title adds a lot to the story

Adaptation
A TV movie was made around 1996.

References

Detective fiction
Novels by Satyajit Ray
1976 short stories
1976 Indian novels